Barcino may refer to:
 Barcelona, Spain – Barcino in Latin
 Barcino, Poland
 Barcino (PKP station)
 Barcelonette, Barcino Nova in Latin
 Barcino (cnidarian), a genus of cnidarians in the family Barcinidae